Kevin Philip Sharp (born 19 September 1974) is a Canadian-born English former footballer.

Career
He began his career as at French club AJ Auxerre, but left in 1992 for England, where he spent the vast majority of his career. His first English club was Leeds United, joining for £60,000. He made just 17 league appearances in three years at the Yorkshire club, then one of the top clubs in England.

Moving to Wigan Athletic in November 1995 for a £100,000 fee, he made 216 appearances in six years. Wigan won promotion to Division Two in 1997. Whilst at Wigan he also played in the final as they won the 1998–99 Football League Trophy.

In November 2001 he joined Wrexham on a free transfer. He played just 15 times for the Welsh club, and Wrexham were relegated from Division Two that season. In August 2002, Sharp left for Huddersfield Town on another free transfer. Sharp played regularly, but again his club were relegated from Division Two. Yet again moving to a Division 2 club on a free transfer this time to Scunthorpe United.

A season in the newly renamed fourth tier of English football, Football League Two, ended in promotion for Scunthorpe, but Sharp was to stay in the division. He had made 46 league appearances  - exactly half of Scunthorpe's league matches over the two years with the club. Sharp joined Shrewsbury prior to the 2005-06 season, with manager Gary Peters installed him as club captain. However, in early 2006, loss of form resulted in Shrewsbury fans turning against him, and Peters was forced to drop him from the team at the end of February 2006. Playing on only two further occasions in the following six weeks, he was released.

Sharp joined Hamilton Academical, in the Scottish Football League First Division, on an amateur basis in November 2006. He made his debut against Livingston in December 2006. Kevin was released by the club at the end of January 2007 due to the return of other experienced players in his position.

International career
He represented England at youth level. Sharp was part of the victorious England team at the 1993 UEFA European Under-18 Championship beating Turkey 1–0 in the final. He played regularly at left back.

Coaching career
He then joined Northwich Victoria, where he was a player-coach. In June 2009 Sharp was appointed as player/assistant manager at Harrogate Town of the Conference North - a position he no longer holds.

Football agent
Sharp is now a licensed football agent, with his clients including Leeds United midfielder Kalvin Phillips.

Career statistics

References

External links

Profile at leeds-fans.org.uk
https://www.theguardian.com/football/blog/2009/jun/29/forgotten-story-england-under-18-1993
England FA profile

1974 births
AJ Auxerre players
Association football defenders
English people of Canadian descent
Canadian people of English descent
Canadian soccer players
English footballers
English Football League players
Guiseley A.F.C. players
Hamilton Academical F.C. players
Scottish Football League players
Harrogate Town A.F.C. players
Huddersfield Town A.F.C. players
Leeds United F.C. players
Living people
Northwich Victoria F.C. players
Premier League players
Scunthorpe United F.C. players
Shrewsbury Town F.C. players
Soccer people from Ontario
Sportspeople from Sarnia
Wigan Athletic F.C. players
Wrexham A.F.C. players
England youth international footballers
Canadian expatriate soccer players
Canadian expatriate sportspeople in Scotland
Canadian expatriate sportspeople in England
Canadian expatriate sportspeople in Wales